In the First Folio, the plays of William Shakespeare were grouped into three categories: comedies, histories, and tragedies.  The histories—along with those of contemporary Renaissance playwrights—help define the genre of history plays. The Shakespearean histories are biographies of English kings of the previous four centuries and include the standalones King John, Edward III and Henry VIII as well as a continuous sequence of eight plays.  These last are considered to have been composed in two cycles. The so-called first tetralogy, apparently written in the early 1590s, covers the Wars of the Roses saga and includes Henry VI, Parts I, II & III and Richard III. The second tetralogy, finished in 1599 and including Richard II, Henry IV, Parts I & II and Henry V, is frequently called the Henriad after its protagonist Prince Hal, the future Henry V.

The folio's classifications are not unproblematic. Besides proposing other categories such as romances and problem plays, many modern studies treat the histories together with those tragedies that feature historical characters. These include Macbeth, set in the mid-11th century during the reigns of Duncan I of Scotland and Edward the Confessor and the legendary King Lear and also the Roman plays Coriolanus, Julius Caesar, and Antony and Cleopatra.

List of Shakespeare's histories

English histories
As they are in the First Folio, the plays are listed here in the sequence of their action, rather than the order of the plays' composition. Short forms of the full titles are used.
 King John
 Edward III
 Richard II
 Henry IV, Part 1
 Henry IV, Part 2
 Henry V
 Henry VI, Part 1
 Henry VI, Part 2
 Henry VI, Part 3
 Richard III
 Henry VIII

Roman histories
As noted above, the First Folio groups these with the tragedies.
 Coriolanus
 Julius Caesar
 Antony and Cleopatra
Set in ancient Rome, Titus Andronicus dramatises a fictional story and is therefore excluded as a Roman history.

Other histories
As with the Roman plays, the First Folio groups these with the tragedies. Although they are connected with regional royal biography, and based on similar sources, they are usually not considered part of Shakespeare's English histories.
 King Lear
 Macbeth
 Hamlet

Sources
The source for most of the English history plays, as well as for Macbeth and King Lear, is the well-known Raphael Holinshed's Chronicles of English history. The source for the Roman history plays is Plutarch's Lives of the Noble Grecians and Romans Compared Together, in the translation made by Sir Thomas North in 1579. Shakespeare's history plays focus on only a small part of the characters' lives, and also frequently omit significant events for dramatic purposes.

Politics in the English history plays
Shakespeare was living in the reign of Elizabeth I, the last monarch of the House of Tudor, and his history plays are often regarded as Tudor propaganda because they show the dangers of civil war and celebrate the founders of the Tudor dynasty. In particular, Richard III depicts the last member of the rival House of York as an evil monster ("that bottled spider, that foul bunchback'd toad"), a depiction disputed by many modern historians, while portraying his successor, Henry VII, in glowing terms. Political bias is also clear in Henry VIII, which ends with an effusive celebration of the birth of Elizabeth. However, Shakespeare's celebration of Tudor order is less important in these plays than his presentation of the spectacular decline of the medieval world. Some of Shakespeare's histories—notably Richard III—point out that this medieval world came to its end when opportunism and Machiavellianism infiltrated its politics. By nostalgically evoking the late Middle Ages, these plays described the political and social evolution that had led to the actual methods of Tudor rule, so that it is possible to consider the English history plays as a biased criticism of their own country.

Lancaster, York, and Tudor myths

Shakespeare made use of the Lancaster and York myths, as he found them in the chronicles, as well as the Tudor myth. The 'Lancaster myth'  regarded Richard II's overthrow and Henry IV's reign as providentially sanctioned, and Henry V's achievements as a divine favour. The 'York myth'  saw Edward IV's deposing of the ineffectual Henry VI as a providential restoration of the usurped throne to the lawful heirs of Richard II. The 'Tudor myth'  formulated by the historians and poets recognised Henry VI as a lawful king, condemned the York brothers for killing him and Prince Edward, and stressed the hand of divine providence in the Yorkist fall and in the rise of Henry Tudor, whose uniting of the houses of Lancaster and York had been prophesied by the 'saintly' Henry VI. Henry Tudor's deposing of Richard III "was justified on the principles of contemporary political theory, for Henry was not merely rebelling against a tyrant but putting down a tyrannous usurper, which The Mirror for Magistrates allowed". Because Henry Tudor prayed before Bosworth Field to be God's minister of punishment, won the battle and attributed victory to Providence, the Tudor myth asserted that his rise was sanctioned by divine authority.

The later chroniclers, especially Polydore Vergil, Edward Hall and Raphael Holinshed, were not interested in 'justifying' the Tudor regime by asserting the role of Providence; instead they stressed the lessons to be learned from the workings of Providence in the past, sometimes endorsing contradictory views of men and events for the sake of the different lessons these suggested, sometimes slanting their interpretations to draw a parallel with, or a moral for, their time. Consequently, though Hall in his Union of the Two Noble and Illustre Families of Lancastre and Yorke (1548) saw God's curse laid upon England for the deposing and murder of Richard II, God finally relenting and sending peace in the person and dynasty of Henry Tudor, and though Holinshed's final judgement was that Richard Duke of York and his line were divinely punished for violating his oath to let Henry VI live out his reign, the chroniclers tended to incorporate elements of all three myths in their treatment of the period from Richard II to Henry VII. For Shakespeare's use of the three myths, see Interpretations.

Interpretations

Shakespeare's double tetralogy
H. A. Kelly in Divine Providence in the England of Shakespeare's Histories (1970) examines political bias and assertions of the workings of Providence in (a) the contemporary chronicles, (b) the Tudor historians, and (c) the Elizabethan poets, notably Shakespeare in his two tetralogies, (in composition-order) Henry VI  to Richard III and Richard II to Henry V.  According to Kelly, Shakespeare's great contribution, writing as a historiographer-dramatist, was to eliminate the supposedly objective providential judgements of his sources, and to distribute them to appropriate spokesmen in the plays, presenting them as mere opinion. Thus the sentiments of the Lancaster myth are spoken by Lancastrians, the opposing myth is voiced by Yorkists, and the Tudor myth is embodied in Henry Tudor. Shakespeare "thereby allows each play to create its own ethos and mythos and to offer its own hypotheses concerning the springs of action".

Where the chronicles sought to explain events in terms of divine justice, Shakespeare plays down this explanation. Richard Duke of York, for example, in his speech to Parliament about his claim, placed great stress, according to the chronicles, on providential justice; Shakespeare's failure to make use of this theme in the parliament scene at the start of 3 Henry VI, Kelly argues, "would seem to amount to an outright rejection of it". In the first tetralogy, Henry VI never views his troubles as a case of divine retribution; in the second tetralogy, evidence for an overarching theme of providential punishment of Henry IV "is completely lacking". Among the few allusions in the plays to hereditary providential punishment are Richard II's prediction, at his abdication, of civil war, Henry IV's fear of punishment through his wayward son, Henry V's fear of punishment for his father's sins, and Clarence's fear of divine retribution meted out on his children. Again, where the chronicles argue that God was displeased with Henry VI's marriage to Margaret and the broken vow to the Armagnac girl, Shakespeare has Duke Humphrey object to Margaret because the match entails the loss of Anjou and Maine. (Kelly dismisses the view of E. M. W. Tillyard and A. S. Cairncross of Margaret as the diabolical successor to Joan of Arc in England's punishment by God.) As for suggestions of a benevolent Providence, Shakespeare does appear to adopt the chronicles' view that Talbot's victories were due to divine aid, where Joan of Arc's were down to devilish influence, but in reality he lets the audience see that "she has simply outfoxed [Talbot] by superior military strategy". (Talbot's eventual defeat and death are blamed in Shakespeare not on Joan but on dissention among the English.) In place of providential explanations, Shakespeare often presents events more in terms of poetic justice or Senecan dramaturgy. Dreams, prophecies and curses, for example, loom large in the earlier tetralogy and "are dramatized as taking effect", among them Henry VI's prophecy about the future Henry VII.

[[File:Joan of Arc conjures demons in Shakespeare's 'Henry VI'; but Wellcome V0025889EL.jpg|thumb|right|200px|'Joan of Arc conjures demons in Shakespeare's Henry VI (engraving by C. Warren, 1805, after J. Thurston). "Next to her, Talbot is a blundering oaf, who furiously attributes her success to sorcery, whereas the audience knows that she has simply outfoxed him by superior military strategy." – H. A. Kelly (1970)]]
Accordingly, Shakespeare's moral characterisation and political bias, Kelly argues, change from play to play, "which indicates that he is not concerned with the absolute fixing of praise or blame", though he does achieve general consistency within each play:

Many of his changes in characterisation must be blamed upon the inconsistencies of the chroniclers before him. For this reason, the moral conflicts of each play must be taken in terms of that play, and not supplemented from the other plays.

Shakespeare meant each play primarily to be self-contained. Thus in Richard II the murder of Thomas of Woodstock, Duke of Gloucester, inaugurates the action—John of Gaunt places the guilt on Richard II—but Woodstock is forgotten in the later plays. Again, Henry IV, at the end of Richard II, speaks of a crusade as reparation for Richard's death: but in the next two plays he does not show remorse for his treatment of Richard. As for the Henry VI plays, the Yorkist view of history in 1 Henry VI differs from that in 2 Henry VI: in Part 1 the conspiracy of the Yorkist Richard Earl of Cambridge against Henry V is admitted; in Part 2 it is passed silently over. Henry VI's attitude to his own claim undergoes changes. Richard III does not refer to any events prior to Henry VI's reign.

Kelly finds evidence of Yorkist bias in the earlier tetralogy. 1 Henry VI has a Yorkist slant in the dying Mortimer's narration to Richard Plantagenet (later Duke of York). Henry VI is weak and vacillating and overburdened by piety; neither Yorkists nor Queen Margaret think him fit to be king. The Yorkist claim is put so clearly that Henry admits, aside, that his own is weak—"the first time," notes Kelly, "that such an admission is conjectured in the historical treatment of the period". Shakespeare is suggestively silent in Part 3 on the Yorkist Earl of Cambridge's treachery in Henry V's reign. Even loyal Exeter admits to Henry VI that Richard II could not have resigned the crown legitimately to anyone but the heir, Mortimer. Edward (later IV) tells his father York that his oath to Henry was invalid because Henry had no authority to act as magistrate.

As for Lancastrian bias, York is presented as unrighteous and hypocritical in 2 Henry VI, and while Part 2 ends with Yorkist victories and the capture of Henry, Henry still appears "the upholder of right in the play". In Richard III in the long exchange between Clarence and the assassins we learn that not only Clarence but also implicitly the murderers and Edward IV himself consider Henry VI to have been their lawful sovereign. The Duchess of York's lament that her family "make war upon themselves, brother to brother, blood to blood, self against self" derives from Vergil and Hall's judgment that the York brothers paid the penalty for murdering King Henry and Prince Edward. In the later tetralogy Shakespeare clearly inclines towards the Lancaster myth. He makes no mention of Edmund Mortimer, Richard's heir, in Richard II, an omission which strengthens the Lancastrian claim. The plan in Henry IV to divide the kingdom in three undermines Mortimer's credibility. The omission of Mortimer from Henry V was again quite deliberate: Shakespeare's Henry V has no doubt about his own claim. Rebellion is presented as unlawful and wasteful in the second tetralogy: as Blunt says to Hotspur, "out of limit and true rule / You stand against anointed majesty".

Shakespeare's retrospective verdict, however, on the reign of Henry VI, given in the epilogue to Henry V, is politically neutral: "so many had the managing" of the state that "they lost France and made his England bleed". In short, though Shakespeare "often accepts the moral portraitures of the chronicles which were originally produced by political bias, and has his characters commit or confess to crimes which their enemies falsely accused them of" (Richard III being perhaps a case in point), his distribution of the moral and spiritual judgements of the chronicles to various spokesmen creates, Kelly believes, a more impartial presentation of history.

Shakespearean history in the wider sense
John F. Danby in Shakespeare’s Doctrine of Nature (1949) examines the response of Shakespeare's history plays (in the widest sense) to the vexed question: 'When is it right to rebel?’, and concludes that Shakespeare's thought ran through three stages: (1) In the Wars of the Roses plays, Henry VI to Richard III, Shakespeare shows a new thrustful godlessness attacking the pious medieval structure represented by Henry VI. He implies that rebellion against a legitimate and pious king is wrong, and that only a monster such as Richard of Gloucester would have attempted it. (2) In King John and the Richard II to Henry V cycle, Shakespeare comes to terms with the Machiavellianism of the times as he saw them under Elizabeth. In these plays he adopts the official Tudor ideology, by which rebellion, even against a wrongful usurper, is never justifiable. (3) From Julius Caesar onwards, Shakespeare justifies tyrannicide, but in order to do so moves away from English history to the camouflage of Roman, Danish, Scottish or Ancient British history.

Danby argues that Shakespeare's study of the Machiavel is key to his study of history. His Richard III, Faulconbridge in King John, Hal and Falstaff are all Machiavels, characterised in varying degrees of frankness by the pursuit of "Commodity" (i.e. advantage, profit, expediency).John F. Danby, Shakespeare’s Doctrine of Nature – A Study of 'King Lear'  (London 1949), pp. 72–74. Shakespeare at this point in his career pretends that the Hal-type Machiavellian prince is admirable and the society he represents historically inevitable. Hotspur and Hal are joint heirs, one medieval, the other modern, of a split Faulconbridge. Danby argues, however, that when Hal rejects Falstaff he is not reforming, as is the common view, but merely turning from one social level to another, from Appetite to Authority, both of which are equally part of the corrupt society of the time. Of the two, Danby argues, Falstaff is the preferable, being, in every sense, the bigger man. In Julius Caesar there is a similar conflict between rival Machiavels: the noble Brutus is a dupe of his Machiavellian associates, while Antony's victorious "order", like Hal's, is a negative thing. In Hamlet king-killing becomes a matter of private rather than public morality—the individual's struggles with his own conscience and fallibility take centre stage. Hamlet, like Edgar in King Lear later, has to become a "machiavel of goodness". In Macbeth the interest is again public, but the public evil flows from Macbeth's primary rebellion against his own nature. "The root of the machiavelism lies in a wrong choice. Macbeth is clearly aware of the great frame of Nature he is violating."

King Lear, in Danby's view, is Shakespeare's finest historical allegory. The older medieval society, with its doting king, falls into error, and is threatened by the new Machiavellianism; it is regenerated and saved by a vision of a new order, embodied in the king's rejected daughter. By the time he reaches Edmund, Shakespeare no longer pretends that the Hal-type Machiavellian prince is admirable; and in Lear he condemns the society which is thought to be historically inevitable. Against this he holds up the ideal of a transcendent community and reminds the audience of the "true needs" of a humanity to which the operations of a Commodity-driven society perpetually do violence. This "new" thing that Shakespeare discovers is embodied in Cordelia. The play thus offers an alternative to the feudal–Machiavellian polarity, an alternative foreshadowed in France's speech (I.1.245–256), in Lear and Gloucester's prayers (III.4. 28–36; IV.1.61–66), and in the figure of Cordelia. Cordelia, in the allegorical scheme, is threefold: a person, an ethical principle (love), and a community. Until that decent society is achieved, we are meant to take as role-model Edgar, the Machiavel of patience, of courage and of "ripeness". After King Lear Shakespeare's view seems to be that private goodness can be permanent only in a decent society.<ref>John F. Danby, Shakespeare’s Doctrine of Nature – A Study of King Lear, (Faber, London, 1949)</ref>

Shakespeare and the chronicle play genre

Dates and themes
Chronicle plays—history-plays based on the chronicles of Polydore Vergil, Edward Hall, Raphael Holinshed and others—enjoyed great popularity from the late 1580s to c. 1606. By the early 1590s they were more numerous and more popular than plays of any other kind. John Bale's morality play Kynge Johan [:King John], c. 1547, is sometimes considered a forerunner of the genre. King John was of interest to 16th century audiences because he had opposed the Pope; two further plays were written about him in the late 16th century, one of them Shakespeare's Life and Death of King John. Patriotic feeling at the time of the Spanish Armada contributed to the appeal of chronicle plays on the Hundred Years' War, notably Shakespeare's Henry VI trilogy, while unease over the succession at the close of Elizabeth's reign made plays based on earlier dynastic struggles from the reign of Richard II to the Wars of the Roses topical. Plays about the deposing and killing of kings, or about civil dissension, met with much interest in the 1590s, while plays dramatising supposedly factual episodes from the past, advertised as "true history" (though the dramatist might know otherwise), drew larger audiences than plays with imagined plots.

The chronicle play, however, always came under close scrutiny by the Elizabethan and Jacobean authorities. Playwrights were banned from touching "matters of divinity or state", a ban that remained in force throughout the period, the Master of Revels acting as licenser.Chambers, E. K., The Elizabethan Stage (Oxford, 1923), vol. 4, p. 305 The deposition scene in Richard II (IV.i.154–318), for example, almost certainly part of the play as it was originally written, was omitted from the early quartos (1597, 1598, 1608) and presumably performances, on grounds of prudence, and not fully reinstated till the First Folio. The chronicle play, as a result, tended ultimately to endorse the principles of 'Degree', order, and legitimate royal prerogative, and so was valued by the authorities for its didactic effect.Campbell, L. B., Shakespeare's Histories (San Marino 1947) Some have suggested that history plays were quietly subsidised by the state, for propaganda purposes. The annual grant of a thousand pounds by the Queen to the Earl of Oxford from 1586 was, it has been argued, "meant to assist him as theatrical entrepreneur for the Court, in such a way that it would not become known that the Queen was offering substantial backing to the acting companies".Ward, B. M., The Seventeenth Earl of Oxford (1550–1604), from Contemporary Documents (London, 1928), pp. 257, 282 Oxford was to support plays "which would educate the English people ... in their country's history, in appreciation of its greatness, and of their own stake in its welfare". Whether coincidence or not, a spate of history plays followed the authorization of the annuity. B. M. Ward pointed out (1928) that the elaborated, unhistorical and flattering role assigned to an earlier Earl of Oxford, the 11th, in The Famous Victories of Henry V (c. 1587), was designed as an oblique compliment to a contemporary financial backer of chronicle plays. By contrast, a less heroic ancestor of Oxford's, Robert de Vere, the 9th earl, who deserted at the Battle of Radcot Bridge, is left out of Thomas of Woodstock, which deals with the first part of Richard II's reign, though he was one of the king's early circle of favourites and a contemporary of Robert Tresilian, the play's villain.

Development
The early chronicle plays such as The Famous Victories of Henry the Fifth were, like the chronicles themselves, loosely structured, haphazard, episodic; battles and pageantry, spirits, dreams and curses, added to their appeal. The scholar H. B. Charlton gave some idea of their shortcomings when he spoke of "the wooden patriotism of The Famous Victories, the crude and vulgar Life and Death of Jack Straw, the flatness of The Troublesome Reign of King John, and the clumsy and libellous Edward I ". Under the influence of Marlowe's Tamburlaine, however, c. 1587, with its lofty poetry and its focus on a single unifying figure, of Shakespeare's Contention plays, c. 1589–90, and of the machiavels of revenge tragedy, chronicle-plays rapidly became more sophisticated in characterisation, structure, and style. Marlowe himself turned to English history as a result of the success of Shakespeare's Contention.Charlton, H. B., Waller, R. D., Lees, F. N., eds., Marlowe: Edward II (London 1955, 2nd edn.), Reviser's Notes In Edward II, c. 1591, he moved from the rhetoric and spectacle of Tamburlaine to "the interplay of human character", showing how chronicle material could be compressed and rearranged, and bare hints turned to dramatic effect.Braunmuller, A. R., Shakespeare: King John (Oxford, 1989), p. 10

Shakespeare then took the genre further, bringing deeper insights to bear on the nature of politics, kingship, war and society. He also brought noble poetry to the genre and a deep knowledge of human character. In particular, he took a greater interest than Marlowe in women in history, and portrayed them with more subtlety. In interpreting events in terms of character, more than in terms of Providence or Fortune, or of mechanical social forces, Shakespeare could be said to have had a "philosophy of history". With his genius for comedy he worked up in a comic vein chronicle material such as Cade's revolt and the youth of Prince Hal; with his genius for invention, he largely created vital figures like Fauconbridge (if The Troublesome Reign was his) and Falstaff. His chronicle plays, taken together in historical order, have been described as constituting a "great national epic". Argument for possible Shakespearean authorship or part-authorship of Edward III and Thomas of Woodstock has in recent years sometimes led to the inclusion of these plays in the Shakespeare cycle.

Uncertainty about composition-dates and authorship of the early chronicle plays makes it difficult to attribute influence or give credit for initiating the genre. Some critics believe that Shakespeare has a fair claim to have been the innovator. In 1944 E. M. W. Tillyard argued that The Famous Victories of Henry the Fifth, c. 1586–87, could have been a work of Shakespeare's apprenticeship, a claim developed by Seymour Pitcher in 1961. Pitcher argued that annotations to a copy Edward Hall's Union of the Two Noble and Illustre Families of Lancastre and Yorke that was discovered in 1940 (the volume is now in the British Library) were probably written by Shakespeare and that these are very close to passages in the play.Keen, Alan; Lubbock, Roger, The Annotator; The Pursuit of an Elizabethan Reader of Halle's 'Chronicle' Involving Some Surmises About The Early Life of William Shakespeare (London 1954) Again, W. J. Courthope (1905), E. B. Everitt (1965) and Eric Sams (1995) argued that The Troublesome Reign of King John, c. 1588–89, was Shakespeare's early version of the play later rewritten as The Life and Death of King John (the Second Quarto, 1611, had attributed The Troublesome Reign to "W.Sh.").Sams, Eric, The Real Shakespeare: Retrieving the Early Years, 1564–1594 (New Haven 1995), pp. 146–153 Sams called The Troublesome Reign "the first modern history play". Everitt and Sams also believed that two early chronicle plays based on Holinshed and dramatising 11th century English history, Edmund Ironside, or War Hath Made All Friends, written c. 1588–89, and its lost sequel Hardicanute, performed in the 1590s, were by Shakespeare. A rival claimant to be the first English chronicle play is The True Tragedie of Richard the Third, of unknown authorship from the same period. In practice, however, playwrights were both 'influencers' and influenced: Shakespeare's two Contention plays (1589–90), influenced by Marlowe's Tamburlaine (1587), in turn influenced Marlowe's Edward II, which itself influenced Shakespeare's Richard II.Charlton, H. B., Waller, R. D., Lees, F. N., eds., Marlowe: Edward II (London 1955, 2nd edn.), p. 219

Of later chronicle plays, T. S. Eliot considered Ford's Chronicle History of Perkin Warbeck "unquestionably [his] highest achievement" and "one of the very best historical plays outside of the works of Shakespeare in the whole of Elizabethan and Jacobean drama." Chronicle plays based on the history of other countries were also written during this period, among them Marlowe's The Massacre at Paris, Chapman's Charles, Duke of Biron, Webster's lost Guise, and Shakespeare's Macbeth. In some of the chronicle-based plays, as the various contemporary title-pages show, the genres of 'chronicle history' and 'tragedy' overlap.

Decline
Several causes led to the decline of the chronicle play in the early 17th century: a degree of satiety (many more chronicle plays were produced than the surviving ones listed below); a growing awareness of the unreliability of the genre as history; the vogue for 'Italianate' subject-matter (Italian, Spanish or French plots); the vogue for satirical drama of contemporary life ('city comedy'); the movement among leading dramatists, including Shakespeare, away from populism and towards more sophisticated court-centred tastes; the decline in national homogeneity with the coming of the Stuarts, and in the 'national spirit', that ended in civil war and the closing of the theatres (1642). Some of these factors are touched on by Ford in his Prologue to Perkin Warbeck (c. 1630), a defence of the chronicle play.

{| class="wikitable"  align=right style="margin:0 0 1em 1em"
|+ Table A: English chronicle plays, by reign dramatized
|-
| Reign || Play || Playwright(s) || Date(s)
|-
| Edmund Ironside || Edmund Ironside, or War Hath Made All Friends || Shakespeare (?) || written c. 1588–89 (?)
|-
| ...
|-
| John || Kynge Johan || John Bale || written 1540s (?)
|-
| || The Troublesome Raigne of John, King of England || George Peele (?) / Shakespeare (?) Sams, Eric, The Real Shakespeare: Retrieving the Early Years (New Haven, 1995), pp. 146–153 ||  written c. 1588; published 1591
|-
| || The Life and Death of King John || Shakespeare || written c. 1595; published 1623
|-
| Henry III || — || — || —
|-
| Edward I || The Famous Chronicle of King Edward the First || George Peele || written 1590–91; published 1593
|-
| Edward II || The Troublesome Reign and Lamentable Death of Edward the Second, King of England || Christopher Marlowe || written c. 1591–92; published 1594
|-
| Edward III || The Raigne of King Edward the Third || Shakespeare (?)  || written c. 1589, revised c. 1593–94; published 1596
|-
| Richard II || The Life and Death of Iack Straw, a Notable Rebell in England || George Peele (?) || published 1593
|-
| || Thomas of Woodstock; or King Richard the Second, Part One || Samuel Rowley (?) / Shakespeare (?) || written c. 1590
|-
| || The Tragedie of King Richard the Second / The Life and Death of King Richard the Second || Shakespeare || written c. 1595; published 1597, later enlarged
|-
| Henry IV || The Historie of Henrie the Fourth / The First Part of Henry the Fourth || Shakespeare || written c. 1597; published 1599
|-
| || The Second Part of Henrie the Fourth || Shakespeare || written c. 1598; published 1600
|-
| Henry V || The Famous Victories of Henry the Fifth || Samuel Rowley (?) / Shakespeare (?) || written c. 1586; published 1598
|-
| || The Cronicle History of Henry the Fift (Quarto) || Shakespeare || written 1590s; published 1600
|-
| || The Life of King Henry the Fift (Folio) || Shakespeare || written 1599, published 1623
|-
| || The True and Honourable Historie of the Life of Sir John Oldcastle || Anthony Munday, Michael Drayton, Richard Hathwaye and Robert Wilson || published 1600
|-
| Henry VI || The First Part of Henry the Sixt || Shakespeare || written c. 1590–91; published 1623
|-
| || The First Part of the Contention Betwixt the Two Famous Houses of Yorke and Lancaster (Quarto)|| Shakespeare || written c. 1589–90 published 1594
|-
| || The Second Part of Henry the Sixt (Folio)|| Shakespeare || published 1623
|-
| Henry VI and Edward IV || The True Tragedie of Richard Duke of Yorke, and the Death of Good King Henrie the Sixt (Quarto)|| Shakespeare || written c. 1589–90; published 1595
|-
| || The Third Part of Henry the Sixt (Folio)|| Shakespeare || published 1623
|-
| Edward IV || The First and Second Partes of King Edward the Fourth, containing His Mery Pastime with the Tanner of Tamworth, as Also His Loue to Faire Mistrisse Shoar || Thomas Heywood || published 1599
|-
| Edward IV, Edward V, Richard III || The True Tragedie of Richard the Third || Thomas Lodge (?) / George Peele (?) / Thomas Kyd (?) / Shakespeare (?) || written c. 1585 or 1587–88 (?) or c. 1589–90; published 1594
|-
| || The Tragedy of King Richard the Third || Shakespeare || written c. 1591–93; published 1597
|-
| Henry VII || The Chronicle History of Perkin Warbeck || John Ford || written c. 1630; published 1634
|-
| Henry VIII || All is True or The Famous History of the Life of King Henry the Eight || Shakespeare and (?) John Fletcher || written c. 1613; published 1623
|-
| || Sir Thomas More || Anthony Munday, Henry Chettle, Thomas Heywood, Thomas Dekker, Shakespeare || written 1590s
|-
| || The True Chronicle Historie of the Life and Death of Thomas Lord Cromwell || Wentworth Smith (?) || published 1613
|-
| || When You See Me You Know Me; or The Famous Chronicle Historie of King Henrie the Eight, with the Birth and Virtuous Life of Edward Prince of Wales || Samuel Rowley || published 1605
|-
| Edward VI || || ||
|-
| Mary I || Sir Thomas Wyatt || Thomas Dekker and John Webster || written c. 1607
|-
| Mary I, Elizabeth I || If You Know Not Me, You Know No Bodie, or The Troubles of Queene Elizabeth || Thomas Heywood || published 1605
|-
| Elizabeth I || The Second Part of If You Know Not Me, You Know No Bodie, or The Troubles of Queene Elizabeth || Thomas Heywood || published 1606
|-
|}

The above tables include both the Quarto and the Folio versions of Henry V and Henry VI Parts 2 and 3, because the Quartos may preserve early versions of these three plays (as opposed to 'corrupted' texts). They exclude chronicle-type plays now lost, like Hardicanute, the probable sequel to Edmund Ironside, and plays based on legend''', such as the anonymous True Chronicle History of King Leir and his three daughters, c. 1587, and Anthony Munday's two plays on Robin Hood, The Downfall of Robert Earl of Huntington and The Death of Robert Earl of Huntington.

Shakespeare and the Roman history play genre
Late 16th and early 17th century 'Roman history' plays—English plays based on episodes in Virgil, Livy, Tacitus, Sallust, and Plutarch—were, to varying degrees, successful on stage from the late 1580s to the 1630s. Their appeal lay partly in their exotic spectacle, partly in their unfamiliar plots, partly in the way they could explore topical themes safely detached from an English context. In Appius and Virginia (c. 1626), for example, John Webster added a non-historical episode (the only one in the play) about the starvation of Roman troops in the field by the neglect of the home authorities, to express his rage at the abandonment and death by starvation of the English army in the Low Countries in 1624–25. Dangerous themes such as rebellion and tyrannicide, ancient freedoms versus authoritarian rule, civic duty versus private ambition, could be treated more safely through Roman history, as Shakespeare treated them in Julius Caesar. Character and moral values (especially 'Roman values') could be explored outside an inhibiting Christian framework.

Shakespeare's Julius Caesar and his pseudo-historical Titus Andronicus were among the more successful and influential of Roman history plays.Spencer, T. J. B., Shakespeare: The Roman Plays (London 1963) Among the less successful was Jonson's Sejanus His Fall, the 1604 performance of which at the Globe was "hissed off the stage". Jonson, misunderstanding the genre, had "confined himself to the dramatization of recorded fact, and refused to introduce anything for which he did not have historical warrant", thus failing to construct a satisfactory plot. According to Park Honan, Shakespeare's own later Roman work, Antony and Cleopatra and Coriolanus, carefully avoided "Sejanuss clotted style, lack of irony, and grinding moral emphasis".

 The above tables exclude Shakespeare's Titus Andronicus (composed c. 1589, revised c. 1593), which is not closely based on Roman history or legend but which, it has been suggested, may have been written in reply to Marlowe's Dido, Queene of Carthage, Marlowe's play presenting an idealised picture of Rome's origins, Shakespeare's "a terrible picture of Rome's end, collapsing into moral anarchy".

The "Wars of the Roses" cycle on stage and in film

"The Wars of the Roses" is a phrase used to describe the civil wars in England between the Lancastrian and Yorkist dynasties. Some of the events of these wars were dramatised by Shakespeare in the history plays Richard II, Henry IV, Part 1, Henry IV, Part 2, Henry V, Henry VI, Part 1, Henry VI, Part 2, Henry VI, Part 3, and Richard III. In the twentieth and twenty-first centuries there have been numerous stage performances, including:
 The first tetralogy (Henry VI parts 1 to 3 and Richard III) as a cycle;
 The second tetralogy (Richard II, Henry IV parts 1 and 2 and Henry V) as a cycle (which has also been referred to as the Henriad); and
 The entire eight plays in historical order (the second tetralogy followed by the first tetralogy) as a cycle. Where this full cycle is performed, as by the Royal Shakespeare Company in 1964, the name The Wars of the Roses has often been used for the cycle as a whole.
 A 10-play history cycle, which began with the newly attributed Edward III, the anonymous Thomas of Woodstock, and then the eight plays from Richard II to Richard III, was performed by Pacific Repertory Theatre under the title, Royal Blood, a phrase used throughout the works. The entire series, staged over four consecutive seasons from 2001 to 2004, was directed by PacRep founder and Artistic Director Stephen Moorer.
 A conflation of the eight plays by Tom Wright and Benedict Andrews, under the title The War of the Roses, was performed by the Sydney Theatre Company in 2009.

The tetralogies have been filmed for television five times, twice as the entire cycle:

 for the 1960 UK serial An Age of Kings directed by Michael Hayes. Featuring David William as Richard II, Tom Fleming as Henry IV, Robert Hardy as Henry V, Terry Scully as Henry VI, Paul Daneman as Richard III, Julian Glover as Edward IV, Mary Morris as Queen Margaret, Judi Dench as Princess Catherine, Eileen Atkins as Joan la Pucelle, Frank Pettingell as Falstaff, William Squire as The Chorus and Justice Shallow, and, Sean Connery as Hotspur.
 for the 1965 UK serial The Wars of the Roses, based on the RSC's 1964 staging of the Second Tetralogy, which condensed the Henry VI plays into two plays called Henry VI and Edward IV. adapted by John Barton and Peter Hall; and directed by Hall. Featuring Ian Holm as Richard III, David Warner as Henry VI, Peggy Ashcroft as Margaret, Donald Sinden as York, Roy Dotrice as Edward and Jack Cade, Janet Suzman as Joan and Lady Anne and William Squire as Buckingham and Suffolk.
 Second Tetralogy filmed for the BBC Television Shakespeare in 1978/1979 directed by David Giles. Richard II was filmed as a stand-alone piece for the first season of the series, with the Henry IV plays and Henry V filmed as a trilogy for the second season. Featuring Derek Jacobi as Richard II, John Gielgud as John of Gaunt, Jon Finch as Henry IV, Anthony Quayle as Falstaff, David Gwillim as Henry V, Tim Pigott-Smith as Hotspur, Charles Gray as York, Wendy Hiller as the Duchess of Gloucester, Brenda Bruce as Mistress Quickly, and Michele Dotrice as Lady Percy.
 First Tetralogy filmed for the BBC Television Shakespeare in 1981 directed by Jane Howell, although the episodes didn't air until 1983. In the First Tetralogy, the plays are performed as if by a repertory theater company, with the same actors appearing in different parts in each play. Featuring Ron Cook as Richard III, Peter Benson as Henry VI, Brenda Blethyn as Joan, Bernard Hill as York, Julia Foster as Margaret, Brian Protheroe as Edward, Paul Jesson as Clarence, Mark Wing-Davey as Warwick, Frank Middlemass as Cardinal Beaufort, Trevor Peacock as Talbot and Jack Cade, Paul Chapman as Suffolk and Rivers, David Burke as Gloucester and Zoe Wanamaker as Lady Anne.
 for a straight-to-video filming, directly from the stage, of the English Shakespeare Company's 1987 production of "The Wars of the Roses" directed by Michael Bogdanov and Michael Pennington. Featuring Pennington as Richard II, Henry V, Buckingham, Jack Cade and Suffolk, Andrew Jarvis as Richard III, Hotspur and the Dauphin, Barry Stanton as Falstaff, The Duke of York and the Chorus in Henry V, Michael Cronin as Henry IV and the Earl of Warwick, Paul Brennan as Henry VI and Pistol, and June Watson as Queen Margaret and Mistress Quickly. The three Henry VI plays are condensed into two plays, bearing the subtitles Henry VI: House of Lancaster and Henry VI: House of York.
 Second Tetralogy filmed as The Hollow Crown for BBC2 in 2012 directed by Rupert Goold (Richard II), Richard Eyre (Henry IV, Parts 1 & 2) and Thea Sharrock (Henry V). Featuring Ben Whishaw as Richard II, Patrick Stewart as John of Gaunt, Rory Kinnear as Henry Bolingbroke (in Richard II) and Jeremy Irons as Henry IV, Tom Hiddleston as Henry V, Simon Russell Beale as Falstaff, Joe Armstrong as Hotspur, and Julie Walters as Mistress Quickly. The first tetralogy was later adapted in 2016.

Many of the plays have also been filmed stand-alone, outside of the cycle at large. Famous examples include Henry V (1944), directed by and starring Laurence Olivier, and Henry V (1989), directed by and starring Kenneth Branagh; Richard III (1955), directed by and starring Olivier, and Richard III (1995), directed by Richard Loncraine and starring Ian McKellen; and Chimes at Midnight (1965) (also known as Falstaff), directed by and starring Orson Welles, combining Henry IV, Part I and Part II, with some scenes from Henry V.

Notes

External links
 Shakespeare's Histories at the British Library
 'Shakespeare's Politics', essay by historian Christopher Morris, The Historical Journal, Vol. 8, No. 3, Cambridge, 1965; pp. 293–308
 Roy, Pinaki. " Much Ado about Politics:A Very Brief Survey of England's Tumultuous History during Shakespeare's Lifetime". Yearly Shakespeare , XV (July 2017): 16–24.
 Roy, Pinaki. " What exactly went wrong with Shakespeare between 1599 and 1608?: A very brief History-based Introspection". Yearly Shakespeare'' , XVI (July 2018): 26–32.

Histories

de:Historie